The Arab Socialist Union of Libya (ASU) was a political party in Libya from 1971 to 1977 led by Muammar Gaddafi. Gaddafi served as chairman of the party.

Many aspects of Muammar Gaddafi's Libyan Arab nationalist, republican, and Arab socialist revolution were based on that of Egyptian President Gamal Abdel Nasser. Like Nasser, Gaddafi seized power with a Free Officers Movement, which in 1971 became the Arab Socialist Union of Libya. Like its Egyptian counterpart, the Libyan ASU was the sole legal party and was designed as a vehicle for integrated national expression rather than as a political party.

Bashir Hawady was the general secretary of the party. In May 1972, the Libyan ASU and the Egyptian ASU agreed to merge their two parties into a single body.

References

1971 establishments in Libya
1977 disestablishments in Libya
Arab nationalism in Libya
Arab Socialist Union
Defunct political parties in Libya
History of Libya under Muammar Gaddafi
Nasserist political parties
Pan-Arabist political parties
Parties of one-party systems
Political parties disestablished in 1977
Political parties established in 1971
Socialist parties in Libya